The Arkansas Valley Correctional Facility is a state prison for men located in Ordway, Crowley County, Colorado, owned and operated by the Colorado Department of Corrections.  The facility opened in 1987 and houses a maximum of 1007 inmates at minimum, medium and high security levels.

References

Prisons in Colorado
Buildings and structures in Crowley County, Colorado
1987 establishments in Colorado